John David Batchelor (born 25 September 1969) is a Singaporean-born Australian television and film actor. He is most known for portraying Chief Petty Officer Marine Technical (CPOMT) / Chief Engineer Andy 'Charge' Thorpe on the Australian drama series Sea Patrol, and Peeto in the Australian feature film Red Dog.

Career
Batchelor graduated from Australia's National Institute of Dramatic Art (NIDA) with a degree in Performing Arts (Acting) in 1992.

Besides portraying the regular role of Andy Thorpe on Sea Patrol, Batchelor has had guest roles on numerous TV series including All Saints, Water Rats, Stingers, and Murder Call. He appeared in the 2003 films, Inspector Gadget 2 and Danny Deckchair, and in the 2008 film The Tender Hook.

Batchelor also had a minor role as a bodyguard in the Australian comedy film Fat Pizza.

In 2011, Batchelor starred as Peeto in the Australian film Red Dog and also portrayed the heart wrenching Wally Tomlinson, an associate of underworld figure Kate Leigh in the highly acclaimed Nine Network series Underbelly: Razor.

In 2012, Batchelor's first main role for the year was as policeman Tony Lewandowski in the Nine Network telemovie, The Great Mint Swindle, the tale about the three innocent Mickelberg brothers who became embroiled in one of the most famous heists in Australia's history.

Personal life
Batchelor was born in Singapore to Australian parents. When he turned 7, he moved to Brisbane Australia where he resided for most of his childhood. He lives in Sydney, Australia, with his family. He has a son named jack, jack Batchelor and a daughter Ella Batchelor.

In a 2012 interview Batchelor revealed that he nearly died from a bacterial infection at age 3. After passing out from a cardiac arrest in the emergency room in Melbourne Children's Hospital, he was revived with CPR and it took 3 months to get better.

As a child, Batchelor and his family moved around frequently, as his father was a high-ranking officer in the Australian army. He spent most of his childhood living in Brisbane while his father worked in the Australian army. He acted in many plays there including And a Nightingale Sang, Jacques and his Master, Bouncers, Cyrano de Bergerac, Macbeth, A Midsummer Night's Dream, The Shaughraun, Sweet Phoebe, Julius Caesar and The Misanthrope. He was awarded 2 State Theatre Awards (Matilda Awards) before leaving to go back to Sydney, Australia.

Awards
Batchelor has won a range of awards, including:
 1995 Exposure Film Festival – Accolade Comedy Actor (The Lotus Room)
 1995 Matilda Award – Outstanding Achievement in Queensland Theatre (Millfire, Christmas at Turkey Beach)
 1997 Matilda Award-Outstanding Achievement in Queensland Theatre (Sweet Phoebe, Oz Shorts)
 1997  Queensland New Filmmakers Awards-Best Actor (The Oblong Box)

TV work

 The Great Mint Swindle - Tony Lewandowski (2012)
 "Home and Away" - Winston Markman (2012, 2013) - 14 episodes
 "Devil's Dust" - Jack Rush, QC (2012) - 2 episodes, miniseries
 Underbelly: Razor - Wally Tomlinson (2011)
 Sea Patrol – Andy 'Charge' Thorpe (2007–2011)
 "Laid" - Jefe (2011) episode 1.4
 ":30 Seconds" - Bobo (2009), episode: Good Clown Bad Clown
 "Bad Cop, Bad Cop" - Uncle Dan (2002), episode: Here Comes the Son
 "All Saints" - Bernie Farrelly/Wayne Calder (2000, 2002), 2 episodes
 "Stingers" - Colin Fletcher/Greg Crowley (1999, 2002), 2 episodes
 "Farscape" - Kcrackic (1998), episode: The Flax
 "Water Rats" - Eric Bourke (1998), 2 episodes
 "Murder Call" - Wayne Pax (1998), episode: Cold Comfort
 "The Wayne Manifesto" - Mr. Scudamore (1997), episode: Special Operations
 "Fire" - Barney (1995), episode: Evening Star
 "Time Trax" - Harry (1994) episode: Mother

Film

 ”Chasing Comets” - Coach Munsey (2018)
 "Huge" - Barry Branch (2012)
 "Red Dog" - Peeto (2011)
 "Franswa Sharl" - Mal Logan (2009)
 "Subdivision" - Pete (2009)
 "The Tender Hook" - Ronnie (2008)
 "Final Call" - Jim Watson (2006)
 "Man-Thing" - Wayne Thibadeaux (2005)
 "Splintered" - Guard Duncan (2005)
 "In Too Deep" - Fisherman (2004)
 "Roll" - Tiny Veneto (2004)
 "Ned" - Shopkeeper and Klansman (2003)
 "Danny Deckchair" - Pete (2003)
 "Inspector Gadget 2" - McKible (2003)
 "The Monkey's Mask" - Steve (2000)
 "City Loop" - Mr Maxwell (2000)
 "The Three Stooges" - Curly Wannabe (2000)
 "Sunday" - Todd Markel (2000)
 "Marriage Acts" - Police Officer (2000)
 "The Tower" - Eric (1997)
 "Mr. Reliable" - Policeman (1996)
 "The Roly Poly Man" - Axel (1994)
 "The Custodian" - Mesero (1993)

Theatre

 ”Storm Boy” (2019)
 "Managing Carmen" - Rohan Swift (2012)
 "Romeo and Juliet" (2006)
 "Festen" (2005)
 "Wars of the Roses" (2005)
 "Twelfth Night" (2004)
 "The Underpants" (2004)
 "The Way of the World" (2003)
 "Anthony and Cleopatra" (2001)
 "Julius Caesar" (2001)
 "Troilus and Cressida" - (2000)
 "Criminal: The Dumb Waiter and Deathwatch" (1998)
 "Oz Shorts" (1997)
 "The Misanthrope" (1997)
 "Solitary Animals" (1997)
 "Sweet Phoebe" (1997)
 "Mr Melancholy" (1997)
 "Bouncers" (1996)
 "Witches I and II" (1996)
 "A Doctor in Spite of Himself" (1996)
 "Christmas at Turkey Beach" (1995)
 "Jacques and His Master" (1994)
 "The Shaughraun or The Lovable Rascal" (1993)
 "Images de Moliere" (1992)

References

External links

http://www.ausstage.edu.au/pages/contributor/6162

1969 births
Australian male film actors
Australian male television actors
Living people